David Eick (born 1968) is an American writer and producer, best known as the executive producer of Battlestar Galactica, for which he also wrote several episodes.  Eick executive produced Caprica and Battlestar Galactica: Blood & Chrome, and Produced Hercules: The Legendary Journeys, Xena: Warrior Princess, American Gothic and Cover Me.

Education 
Eick graduated from the University of Redlands in 1990 with a B.A. in political science and a minor in business administration.

Battlestar Galactica franchise 
In 2003, Eick and Ronald D. Moore developed and executive produced Battlestar Galactica, a “re-imagining” of the 1978 series of the same name. 

Originally created as a mini-series for Sci-Fi Channel, the remake ultimately became a critically acclaimed drama which ran four seasons, earning numerous awards including 18 Emmy nominations, 4 Emmy wins, the Saturn Award for excellence in science fiction and the coveted Peabody Award recognizing "distinguished achievement and meritorious service". The show also won the American Film Institute Award in 2005 and 2006 for its "contribution to America’s cultural legacy", and was honored in 2009 by the United Nations.  

In 2013, the Writers Guild of America recognized Battlestar on its list of The 101 Best-Written Television Series of All Time. 

In 2008, his production company David Eick Productions signed an overall deal with NBC.

References

External links
 

1968 births
Living people
American film producers
Place of birth missing (living people)
University of Redlands alumni